George Ryan (–6 December 1861) was an Irish-born Danish merchant, ship owner, banker and planter. He continued running a trading house and shipping firm founded by his brother Phillip Ryan. He owned the property at Sankt Annæ Plads 7 in Copenhagen and the sugar plantation Mary's Fancy on Saint Croix in the Danish West Indies.

Early life and background
Ryan was born in 1783  or 1785 at Ballinakill in Kilcock, Kildare, Ireland, as the son of squire Edward Ryan ( 1735–1790) and Catherine (Kitty) née O’Reilly (–1828). His maternal grandfather was Philip O'Reilly, Esq., of Coolamber and Ballymorris, County Longford.

Philip Ryan (1766–1809)
Ryan had ten brothers and two sisters. One of the brothers, Phillip Ryan (1766–1809), moved to Copenhagen in 1680 to work for Duntzfelt, Meyer & Co. In 1784, he is mentioned as suparcargo on the ship Helsingør. Back in Copenhagen, in 1795, Ryan passed the captain's exam. Two years later, he captained the frigate Christianshavn on several expeditions to the Danish West Indies. After being licensed as a merchant he started his own trading firm and operated his own fleet of merchant ships. His ships included Elisabeth, which he sold to Duntzfelt in 1802.

Philip Ryan was married to Bolette Fix (1780–1809), daughter of governor of Serampore Johan Leonhard Fix (1736–1807), After her death, he married Eliza Ferrall, Upon his death, she married John Christmas.

He owned the Stanley House in Christianshavn. In 1804, he sold it to cartwright Henry Fine. In 1804, he acquired the Barachmann Mansion but later the same year sold it again to John Christmas.

Career

At the age of 14 or 15, Ryan moved to Copenhagen to work in his brother's firm.  On his brother's death, be became the owner of the firm.

At the end of the Napoleonic Wars in 1814–1815, Ryan was one of the first general traders in Copenhagen to revive the transatlantic trade with sugar from the Danish West Indies. He owned a fleet of four merchant ships.

Ryan was elected as a member of the board of representatives of the Bank of Denmark for two four-year terms. In 1857, he was a co-founder of Privatbanken of whose board he also was a member.

Property

Before 1834, Ryan was the owner of the property at Sankt Annæ Plads 7 in Copenhagen.

On 22 December 1838, partly as an endowment (by will of A. Ducouder) and partly as payment on a loan, Ryan became the owner of the sugar plantation Mary's Fancy on Saint Croix. On 25 June 1859, with the assistance of James Finlay as attorney to Ryan, it was sold to Thomas Dardis for $40,000 (the half transferred to Geo. Elliott).

Personal life

Ryan never married. In 1815, he had a son out of wedlock with Sophie Cecilie Puckendahl (1788–). The boy was born on 8 March 1815 at Fødselsstiftelsen, an institution where it was possible for unmarried women to give birth anonymously. Baptized the same day, he was given the name Carl Frederik. On 7 December the same year he was placed in foster care with a smallholder's wife in Tokkerup. Over the next years, Ryan showed a "fatherly interest" in the boy's upbringing and education. In 1832, Ryan was granted royal permission to adopt the boy, whose name was at the same time changed to Charles Frederik Ryan. In their own time, it was well-known that Ryan was his real father.

 
On 20 September 1836, still unmarried, Charles Frederik Ryan had a son out of wedlock with Dorothea Rønnov. Born at Fødselsstiftelsen, he was given the name Eduoard Charles, The spelling of the first name was later changed to Edward. Charles Frederik Ryan was later married to Johanna Henrika Witthusen (1820–1877) with whom he had daughters Catharina (Kate) Ryan (1849–1914) and Georgina Ryan (c. 1851–). Charles Frederik Ryan died just 44 years old in 1859.

Ryan died on 6 December 1861. Katharina (Kate) Ryan was married to Christian Rosenkilde Treschow (1842–1905), a chamberlain and owner of Frydendal Manor at Holbæk.

See also
 Ryan, U.S. Virgin Islands
 Thomas Ryan (Quebec politician)

References

External links
 George Ryan at geni.com

 Source
 Source
 Source
 Source
 Source
 Source

1780s births
1861 deaths
19th-century Danish businesspeople
Danish businesspeople in shipping
Danish planters
Danish slave owners
Danish sugar plantation owners
Irish emigrants to Denmark
Year of birth uncertain